Konstantinos Kladis (born 30 April 1958) is a Greek football manager.

References

1958 births
Living people
Greek football managers
Kalamata F.C. managers
A.E. Sparta P.A.E. managers
Acharnaikos F.C. managers